A microstrip detector is a particle detector that consists of a large number of identical semiconductor strips laid out along one axis of a two-dimensional structure, generally by lithography. The geometrical layout of the components allows to accurately reconstruct the track of an incoming particle of ionizing radiation.

Silicon microstrip detectors are a common design used in various experiments. The detection mechanism consists of the production of electron-hole pairs in a layer of silicon a few hundreds of micrometers thick. The free electrons are drifted by an electric field created by a pattern of anodes and cathodes interdigitated on the surface of the silicon and separated by a SiO2 insulator.

See also
 Semiconductor detector
 Hybrid pixel detector

References

Particle detectors